Illiberal Reformers: Race, Eugenics, and American Economics in the Progressive Era is a book written by Thomas C. Leonard and published by the Princeton University press which reevaluates several leading figures of the progressive era of American economics, and points out that many of the "progressives"  of the late 19th and early 20th century who created policies such as minimum wage and maximum-hours laws, workmen’s compensation, progressive income taxes and many others had beliefs rooted in Darwinism, racial science, and eugenics, revealing a dark underside to the economic reformers often considered by history to be the altruists in the story of American economic progression.

Overview

Illiberal Reformers begins with the history of the gilded age and the progressive era, discussing how the economy shifted from laissez-faire economics to what has come to be called progressivism. Progressivism, by Leonard's definition, is guided by the following core principles "First, modern government should be guided by science and not politics; and second an industrialized economy should be supervised, regulated, and investigated by the visible hand of a modern administrative state." Leonard details the three "act" process of the rise of progressive economics, beginning with higher education leading to the birth of economists, social scientist, as well as the new business of muckraking journalism. The second act in the rise of the progressives was the economic progressives convincing the American people and leaders that change was needed and that laissez-faire was neither economically nor socially justifiable. The final act in the rise of the progressives is that of the policy that came into place; this includes fixed minimum wage, mandatory public schooling, banning of child labor, maximum hours and many others.

The second part of Illiberal Reformers focuses on the untold part of the story of the rise of the progressives: the fact that the labor reform created by these progressives often sought to exclude immigrants, the disabled, women, and African American workers from the American workforce, which Leonard explains through several primary sources of the era.

Reception
In his review for The New Republic, Malcolm Harris praised the book for not only pointing out these seriously underlooked aspects of progressivism and stated that the book feels like a more credentialed version of the book Liberal Fascism.

The New York Times wrote a fairly favorable review of the book and made several comparisons to the book Imbeciles by Adam Cohen.

References

2016 non-fiction books
Books about economic history
Eugenics books
Princeton University Press books
Progressive Era in the United States